The Wake Forest University School of Business is the graduate business school of Wake Forest University in Winston-Salem, North Carolina. It offers undergraduate program, management-related masters programs, and executive education programs.

History
It was established in 1969 as the Babcock Graduate School of Management, admitting its first classes of full-time and executive students in 1971 and presenting its first graduating class in 1973. The Babcock School was established with a gift from the Mary Reynolds Babcock Foundation and named in honor of Charles H. Babcock, a noted businessman and philanthropist who influenced civic, cultural, and economic development in Winston-Salem and North Carolina.

In 1985, the Babcock Graduate School of Management earned its accreditation from the AACSB, and in 1993, the school moved into the newly constructed Worrell Professional Center, the first building in the nation to house both graduate business and law schools under one roof. In 1987, Babcock launched its evening Master of Business Administration (MBA) program in Winston-Salem, followed by an evening MBA program in Charlotte in 1995 and a Saturday MBA program in Charlotte in 2004.

It was announced in the fall of 2014 that the full-time MBA program would be discontinued in order to focus on the evening program, with the last class matriculating in the spring of 2016.

Academics 
Programs offered there include a Bachelor of Science (BS) degree program for undergraduates with majors in finance, accountancy, mathematical business, and business enterprise management. Graduate business programs include an evening MBA, MA in Management and MS in Accountancy. The School of Business also maintains a campus in Charlotte, North Carolina that houses the Charlotte evening and Saturday MBA programs.

Centers and institutes 
The Wake Forest University School of Business houses several centers and institutions.

 Center for Leadership and Character
 Center for Retail Innovation
 BB&T Center for the Study of Capitalism

Marketing Summit & Elevator Competition 

Each year, the Babcock School hosts a Marketing Summit which includes an MBA case competition, undergraduate case competition and a marketing forum. In the undergraduate case competition, competing teams participate in a three-phase challenge over the course of two months in which they deal with pressing issues facing the event's corporate sponsor.

Another event at the Babcock School is the Elevator Competition. The competition was first held in 2000 and has been held every year since at the Wachovia Center in downtown Winston-Salem. During this competition, MBA students with an interest in entrepreneurship pitch their ideas to a venture capitalist while riding in an elevator for two minutes. The objective is to earn more time to present their ideas formally to a panel of venture capitalists, which chooses the winners.

Lecture series 
Through the Babcock Leadership Series and Broyhill Executive Lecture Series, MBA students can meet, both formally and informally, with business and government leaders.

Notable past speakers have included:
 Elizabeth Dole, former U.S. Senator and former U.S. Secretary of Transportation
 Alan Greenspan, former Chairman of the Federal Reserve Board
 Hugh L. McColl Jr., retired Chairman & CEO of Bank of America
 Bonnie McElveen-Hunter, former U.S. Ambassador to Finland; current Chair of the American Red Cross
 Robert Rubin, former U.S. Secretary of the Treasury; current Director, Citigroup
 Margaret Thatcher, former British Prime Minister
 Anna Cabral, Treasurer of the United States
 John Mackey, Chairman and CEO of Whole Foods Market.

Members of Pilobolus also visited to stress the importance of creative thinking in the business world.

Career Management Center 
The Career Management Center (CMC) staff works with students to assess career options, refine goals, and network with well-placed corporate contacts.  Beyond the immediate job search, the staff works with students to develop interview and résumé skills.

Student clubs and organizations 
Students at the Wake Forest University School of Business can choose from among nearly 20 clubs and organizations, or they can participate in a variety of events including the Greater Babcock Open and a Charity Auction. Student organizations include the Black Business Students Association, Entrepreneurs Club, Hispanic Club, Net Impact Club, Strategy and Consulting Club, Women in Business and The Joint Degree Society.

International relationships 
The Wake Forest University School of Business has long-standing relationships with international business schools including eight international programs that allow faculty and students from each school to teach and study at the other. The partner schools are Bordeaux School of Business, France; EM-Lyon Graduate School of Management, France; European Business School, Germany; Indian Institute of Management Calcutta, India; Institute of Business Studies, Russia; University of Kaiserslautern, Germany; WHU – Otto Beisheim School of Management, Germany and Vienna University of Economics and Business, Austria.

Faculty 
More than 75% of the school's faculty have international consulting, teaching work or research experience. More than 90% hold a PhD or other doctoral degree, 33% serve on a company board of directors, and 30% have experience owning their own company.

Notable alumni 
 Ted Budd - Member of the United States House of Representatives
 Charlie Ergen – Chairman and CEO, EchoStar Communications Corporation
 Cheslie Kryst, Attorney and Miss USA 2019
 Warren Stephens – Chairman, President and CEO, Stephens Inc.
 G. Kennedy Thompson – Chairman, President and CEO, Wachovia Corp.
 Anil Rai Gupta - Chairman and Managing Director, Havells India
 Eric C. Wiseman - Chairman, VF Corporation

See also 
 List of business schools in the United States
 List of Atlantic Coast Conference business schools
 List of United States business school rankings

References

External links
 

Wake Forest University
Business schools in North Carolina
Universities and colleges accredited by the Southern Association of Colleges and Schools
Educational institutions established in 1969
Universities and colleges in Charlotte, North Carolina
1969 establishments in North Carolina